Sexual partners are people who engage in sexual activity together. The sexual partners may be in a committed relationship, either on an exclusive basis or not, or engage in the sexual activity on a casual basis. They may be on intimate terms (in which case they are often referred to as "lovers") or anonymous, as in the case of sex with a stranger, a one-night stand, or a prostitute. A person can be another person's sexual partner even if the sexual activity is illegal, socially taboo, or otherwise in breach of a trust or commitment. A person may have more than one sexual partner at any one time, either as polyamory, polygamy or in contravention of convention.

As such, the term sexual partner can be applied to both consenting and non-consenting sexual relationships. Some people who maintain logs of their sexual activity have adopted the practice of listing partners they both did and did not consent to sex with, but with the non-consenting partners annotated differently in some way to note the act of rape.

A sexual partner may or may not have equal power during a sexual activity; such sexual "roles" (which can sometimes be determined by personality type but can also be determined by a conscious choice by the individual to "assume" a particular "role") typically fall under various dominance/submission (D/s) categories.

Terminology
Generally, a sexual partner is one with whom one engages in a sexual activity on a regular or ongoing basis.

An ex-sexual partner is a person with whom the other partner does not intend to engage in any further sexual activity, while a prospective sexual partner is one with whom the person has not previously engaged in any sexual activity, but desires to do so.

References

 
Sexuality and society